The Party of Reason (PDV) is a libertarian political party in Germany founded in 2009 by Oliver Janich.

The party's policies are based on the Austrian School of economics. It campaigns for libertarian positions, including a minimal state, and free markets.

In September 2013, the PDV, together with libertarian parties from Spain (Party of Individual Freedom), France (Liberal Democratic Party) and the Netherlands (Libertarian Party) signed the Utrecht Declaration and Covenant of European Classical Liberal and Libertarian Parties, establishing the European Party for Individual Liberty (EPIL).

Elections 

In 2011, the PDV participated in the local elections in Lower Saxony, winning one seat in the Flecken Harsefeld municipal council, two seats in the Samtgemeinde Harsefeld municipal council, and a further seat in the Bremervörde municipal council.

Harald Ebert, member of the City council of Erding, and former member of the Free Democratic Party (FDP), joined the PDV in 2012.

The party's first participation in German state elections was in the 2012 North Rhine-Westphalia state election on 13 May 2012, but it did not secure any seats in the Landtag.

The PDV participated 2013 federal election on 22 September 2013, attaining ballot access in four states (Baden-Württemberg, Bavaria, North Rhine-Westphalia and Rhineland-Palatinate), and winning almost 25,000 second votes (0.1%). The party also fielded a number of direct candidates.

References

External links

 Manifesto of the PDV 
 Manifesto of the PDV
 

 
2009 in Germany
Austrian School
Decentralization
Direct democracy parties
Libertarian parties in Germany
Libertarianism in Germany
Political parties established in 2009